Bratz is a 2002 video game based on the Bratz doll line.

Gameplay
In the game, the player must dance through each level using platform-specific controls. Each completed level unlocks new fashions, dance moves to use in the "freestyle" mode, and the next level. At the end of the game, the player unlocks a bonus level. There are 5 different bonus levels, each one specific to the five Bratz girls available to play (Yasmin, Cloe, Sasha, Jade, or Meygan).

References

External links
 

Bratz video games
2002 video games
PlayStation (console) games
Windows games
Game Boy Advance games
Music video games
Video games based on toys
Ubisoft games
Multiplayer and single-player video games
Video games developed in Canada
DC Studios games